The Women's pentathlon 1A was a pentathlon event held in athletics at the 1976 Summer Paralympics in Toronto.

Josefina Cornejo of Mexico was the only competitor. She completed the event, alone, scoring 7633.2 points and taking the gold medal.

References 

Pentathlon
Para